Phantasini is a tribe of longhorn beetles of the subfamily Lamiinae. It was described by Hunt and Stephan von Breuning in 1957.

Taxonomy
 Acanthesthes Kolbe, 1894
 Phantasis Thomson, 1860
 Trichophantasis Sudre & Teocchi, 2000

References

 
Lamiinae
Taxa named by Stephan von Breuning (entomologist)